Altenberg is a town in the Sächsische Schweiz-Osterzgebirge district, in Saxony, Germany.

Geography
The town is situated in the Ore Mountains, 32 km south of Dresden, and 15 km northwest of Teplice, Czech Republic. The village of Zinnwald-Georgenfeld registered the lowest annual mean temperature (4.9 °C) of all inhabited places in Germany during the period 1961–1990. Additionally, it also holds the German record for the highest amount of precipitation recorded in one day, 312 mm. The highest snow depth ever recorded was 163 cm in 2005.

Municipal divisions 
The town Altenberg consists of the following Ortschaften or municipal divisions:

Altenberg (incl. Hirschsprung)
Bärenfels
Bärenstein
Falkenhain (incl. Waldidylle)
Fürstenau (incl. Gottgetreu and Müglitz)
Fürstenwalde
Geising (incl. Löwenhain)
Kipsdorf
Lauenstein
Liebenau
Oberbärenburg (incl. Waldbärenburg)
Rehefeld-Zaunhaus (incl. Neurehefeld and Neuhermsdorf)
Schellerhau
Zinnwald-Georgenfeld

Points of interest 

 The Great Pinge (Große Pinge) of Altenberg is a giant pinge or collapsed mineshaft above old mining excavations (mainly tin ore digging) throughout the last centuries. Today this 12 ha area (150 m deep and 450 m in diameter), bordering the town area, is considered to be one out of 77 of the most important geotopes in Germany.
 DKB-Eiskanal: The Altenberg bobsleigh, luge, and skeleton track venue (official name until 2012: Rennschlitten- und Bobbahn Altenberg (RSBB)).
 The basalt mountain Geisingberg (824 m) with mountain hut, tower and look-out. On the flanks of the hill, at the Geisingberg Meadows preserve area, there are important populations of globe-flowers and wild orchids, blooming in spring and early summer.
 Botanischer Garten Schellerhau, a botanical garden
 Cross-border Mining Education Trail

Sport 
It is home of the Altenberg bobsleigh, luge and skeleton track that has been in use since 1987.

The FIBT World Championships 2008 ran February 11–24, 2008 in Altenberg, Saxony, for the fifth time, having done so in 1991 (bobsleigh), 1994 (skeleton), 1999 (skeleton), and 2000 (men's bobsleigh). It was the first time Altenberg has hosted all of the events at one championship

Sons and daughters of the town 
 Friedrich Leibniz (also Leibnütz), (1597-1652), jurist, philosopher, father of Gottfried Wilhelm Leibniz
 Horst Koschka (born 1943), biathlete
 Manfred Beer (born 1953), biathlete
 Michael Rösch (born 1983), Olympic champion with the biathlon men's relay at the 2006 Winter Olympics in Turin

References

External links

Altenberg (German)

 
Populated places in Sächsische Schweiz-Osterzgebirge
Towns in the Ore Mountains
Mining communities in Germany